The music of the Americas is very diverse since, in addition to many types of Native American music, the music of Europe and the music of Africa have been found there for some five centuries, creating many hybrid forms that have influenced the popular music of the world.

See also
 Canadian music
 American music
 Latin music
 Caribbean music

Culture of the Americas